The 1971 Queen's Club Championships, also known as the Rothmans London Grass Court Championships, was a combined men's and women's tennis tournament played on grass courts at the Queen's Club in London in the United Kingdom that was part of the 1971 Pepsi-Cola Grand Prix. It was the 72nd edition of the tournament and was held from 14 June until 19 June 1971. Stan Smith and Margaret Court won the singles titles.

Finals

Men's singles

 Stan Smith defeated  John Newcombe 8–6, 6–3
 It was Smith's 3rd title of the year and the 12th of his career.

Women's singles
 Margaret Court defeated  Billie Jean King 6–3, 3–6, 6–3

Men's doubles

 Tom Okker /  Marty Riessen defeated  Stan Smith /  Erik van Dillen 8–6, 4–6, 10–8
 It was Okker's 3rd title of the year and the 16th of his career. It was Riessen's 5th title of the year and the 14th of his career.

Women's doubles
 Rosie Casals /  Billie Jean King defeated  Mary–Ann Curtis /  Valerie Ziegenfuss 6–2, 8–6

Notes

References

External links
 ATP tournament profile
 ITF men's tournament edition details

 
Queen's Club Championships
Queen's Club Championships
Queen's Club Championships
Queen's Club Championships
Queen's Club Championships